The following is a list of Lost Universe episodes.

Episode list

References

Lost Universe
Slayers